Events in the year 1855 in Brazil.

Incumbents
Monarch – Pedro II.
Prime Minister – Marquis of Paraná.

Events

Births
 12 May - Hermes da Fonseca

Deaths

References

1850s in Brazil
Years of the 19th century in Brazil
Brazil
Brazil